KRDG is a commercial radio station licensed to Shingletown, California, broadcasting to Shasta County and Tehama County areas on FM 105.3. It airs a classic hits format.

External links
Official KRDG Facebook page

RDG
Classic hits radio stations in the United States
Shasta County, California
Tehama County, California